Fivehead Woods and Meadow is a 62.4 hectare (154.2 acre) biological Site of Special Scientific Interest near the village of Fivehead in Somerset, notified in 1989.

This woodland complex is situated on a ridge of land overlooking West Sedgemoor. The site includes a large breeding colony of grey herons (Ardea cinerea) in one of the woods and breeding pairs of nightingales (Luscinia megarhynchos) as well. Buzzards (Buteo buteo), and sparrowhawks (Accipiter nisus) also breed. The common dormouse (Muscardinus avellanarius), a rare species, is found in at least one of the woods. Swell Wood, which is part of the site, is a Royal Society for the Protection of Birds (RSPB) Reserve.

References 

Sites of Special Scientific Interest in Somerset
Sites of Special Scientific Interest notified in 1989
Nature reserves in Somerset
Woodland Sites of Special Scientific Interest
Forests and woodlands of Somerset
Meadows in Somerset